Turbonilla is a large genus of ectoparasitic sea snails, marine gastropod molluscs in the family Pyramidellidae, the pyrams and their allies.

This genus in its present state is not monophyletic. Many species may end up reclassified in other genera. (personal communication by Philippe Bouchet, chief editor of the Mollusca in WoRMS).

General description
The generally slender, bluish-white to milk-white, semitranslucent shell is more or less elongated and has a cylindro-conic shape.

The apex is sinistral. The reversed, flattened or projecting protoconch consists of 1½ to 3 whorls that are oblique or tilted  from transverse to the axis.

The teleoconch contains many planulate or more or less convex whorls. These are sometimes shouldered and are generally ornamented with less prominent longitudinal ribs ( = costulate).

The intercostal  spaces are  smooth or crossed  bv more  or less distinct, incised, sometimes  raised, spiral lines. The spiral lines often also appear  on the base of the shell, which varies  from short, little  rounded  (the body whorl is subangulated  at the  periphery), to elongate  and well-rounded.

The shape of the aperture varies from subquadrate with a straight columellar lip,  to  an elongate-ovate shape, well-rounded and produced below, with a  curved columellar lip. The peritreme is generally discontinuous, rarely  continuous.

The outer lip is always thin and entire. The inner lip is more or less thickened and reflected, often with a plication or fold that is not always visible externally.

The columella is vertical, not plicate. The columellar fold is single, varying in strength. The horny operculum is subspiral. The shell is usually smaller than in Pyramidella and larger than in Odostomia.

The animal has wide tentacles, an elongated, flattened mentum, usually bilobed in front. The foot is large and anteriorly auriculated.

Species
Species within the genus Turbonilla include:

A

 Turbonilla abbotti (Robba, Di Geronimo, Chaimanee, Negri & Sanfilippo, 2004)
 Turbonilla abercrombiei Melvill, 1896
 Turbonilla abreojensis Dall & Bartsch, 1909
 Turbonilla abreui Peñas & Rolán, 2000
 Turbonilla abrupta Bush, 1899
 Turbonilla abseida Dall & Bartsch, 1906
 Turbonilla academica Strong & Hertlein, 1939
 Turbonilla acer (Laws, 1937) 
 Turbonilla acicularis (A. Adams, 1855)
 Turbonilla acosmia Dall & Bartsch, 1906
 Turbonilla acra Dall & Bartsch, 1909
 Turbonilla actopora Dall & Bartsch, 1906
 Turbonilla aculeus (C. B. Adams, 1852)
 Turbonilla acuta (Donovan, 1804)
 Turbonilla acutissima Monterosato, 1884
 Turbonilla adaba Bartsch, 1915
 Turbonilla admira Nomura, 1937
 Turbonilla adolforolani Peñas & Rolán, 2010
 Turbonilla adusta Dall & Bartsch, 1909
 Turbonilla aemilia Thiele, 1925
 Turbonilla aepynota Dall & Bartsch, 1909
 Turbonilla aequalis (Say, 1826)
 Turbonilla affinis (C. B. Adams, 1852)
 Turbonilla agatha Thiele, 1925
 Turbonilla ailhaudi (Saurin, 1959)
 Turbonilla alarconi Strong, 1949
 Turbonilla alaskana Dall & Bartsch, 1909
 † Turbonilla albolapis (Laws, 1937) 
 Turbonilla alexandrei Güller & Zelaya, 2019
 Turbonilla alexleoni Peñas & Rolán, 2010
 Turbonilla alfredi Abbott, 1958
 Turbonilla almejasensis Bartsch, 1917
 Turbonilla almo Dall & Bartsch, 1909
 Turbonilla alta Clessin, 1902
 Turbonilla alvarezhalconi Peñas & Rolán, 2010
 Turbonilla alvheimi Lygre & Schander, 2010
 Turbonilla amalia Thiele, 1925
 Turbonilla amanda Thiele, 1925
 Turbonilla amandi Strong & Hertlein, 1939
 Turbonilla ambigua (Saurin, 1962)
 Turbonilla americana (d'Orbigny, 1841)
 Turbonilla amiriana Hertlein & Strong, 1951
 Turbonilla amoena (Monterosato, 1878)
 Turbonilla amortajadensis Baker, Hanna & Strong, 1928
 Turbonilla ampliusulcata Peñas & Rolán, 2010
 Turbonilla anae Peñas & Rolán, 2010
 Turbonilla andersi Peñas & Rolán, 2010
 Turbonilla andrewsi Dall & Bartsch, 1909
 Turbonilla angea Bartsch, 1915 
 Turbonilla angelinagagliniae Schander, 1997
 Turbonilla angolensis Schander, 1994
 Turbonilla angusta (Carpenter, 1864): synonym of Chrysallida angusta P. P. Carpenter, 1864
 † Turbonilla angustula Pilsbry & C. W. Johnson, 1917 
 Turbonilla anira Bartsch, 1927
 † Turbonilla anita Aldrich, 1907 
 Turbonilla anna Thiele, 1925
 Turbonilla annamitica (Saurin, 1959)
 Turbonilla annettae Dall & Bartsch, 1909
 Turbonilla anselmoi Peñas & Rolán, 2010
 Turbonilla anselmopenasi Lygre & Schander, 2010
 Turbonilla antestriata Dall & Bartsch, 1907
 Turbonilla antiquitas Peñas & Rolán, 2010
 Turbonilla anularia Peñas & Rolán, 2010
 Turbonilla aola Peñas & Rolán, 2010
 Turbonilla aoteana Powell, 1930
 Turbonilla approximata Dall & Bartsch, 1906
 Turbonilla apsa Bartsch, 1915 
 Turbonilla aquilonaria Silva-Absalao, Dos Santos & De Olivera, 2003
 Turbonilla araceliae Peñas & Rolán, 2010
 Turbonilla aracruzensis Pimenta & Absalao, 2004
 Turbonilla aragoni Dall & Bartsch, 1909
 † Turbonilla aratibacillum Pilsbry & C. W. Johnson, 1917 
 Turbonilla arayai Nomura, 1936
  † Turbonilla arcana Laws, 1937
 Turbonilla archeri Dall & Bartsch, 1904
 Turbonilla arcuata Nomura, 1936
 Turbonilla aresta Dall & Bartsch, 1909
 Turbonilla argentea Sowerby III, 1892
 Turbonilla argentina (Doello-Jurado, 1938)
 Turbonilla aripana Strong, 1949
 Turbonilla armandoi Peñas & Rolán, 2010
 Turbonilla arnoldoi De Jong & Coomans, 1988
 Turbonilla arrighii (Saurin, 1959)
 Turbonilla arta Peñas & Rolán, 2010
 Turbonilla aspera Kuroda & Habe, 1971
 † Turbonilla asperedolata Laws, 1940 
 Turbonilla asperula Bush, 1899
 Turbonilla asser Dall & Bartsch, 1909
 Turbonilla assimilans E. A. Smith, 1890
 Turbonilla asunae Peñas & Rolán, 2010
 Turbonilla asuncionis Strong, 1949
 Turbonilla ata Bartsch, 1926
 Turbonilla atlantica (Locard, 1897)
 Turbonilla atossa Bartsch, 1915 
 Turbonilla attrita Dall & Bartsch, 1909
 Turbonilla atypha Bush, 1899
 Turbonilla aulica Dall & Bartsch, 1906
 Turbonilla aurantia (Carpenter, 1864)
 Turbonilla auricolor Nomura, 1936
 Turbonilla auricoma Dall & Bartsch, 1903
 † Turbonilla awamoana Laws, 1937 
 † Turbonilla awana Nomura, 1938 
 † Turbonilla awasimulans Laws, 1937 
 Turbonilla axeli Bartsch, 1924
 Turbonilla aya Bartsch, 1926
 Turbonilla ayamana Hertlein & Strong, 1951
 Turbonilla azteca Baker, Hanna & Strong, 1926

B

 Turbonilla bacalladoi Peñas & Rolán, 2010
 Turbonilla baegerti Bartsch, 1917
 Turbonilla bahiensis (Castellanos, 1982)
 Turbonilla bakeri Bartsch, 1912
 Turbonilla barazeri Peñas & Rolán, 2010
 Turbonilla barkleyensis Bartsch, 1917
 Turbonilla barrierensis (Laws, 1937)
 Turbonilla barroi Peñas & Rolán, 2010
 Turbonilla bartolomensis Bartsch, 1917
 Turbonilla bartonella Strong & Hertlein, 1939
 Turbonilla bathybius Barnard, 1963
 Turbonilla bayensis van Aartsen & Corgan, 1996
 † Turbonilla beali Jordan, 1936
 Turbonilla bedoyai Peñas & Rolán, 1997
 Turbonilla bega Peñas & Rolán, 2010
 Turbonilla beidaensis Peñas & Rolán, 2000
 Turbonilla belenae Peñas & Rolán, 2010
 Turbonilla belonis Melvill & Standen, 1896
 Turbonilla belotheca Dall, 1889
 Turbonilla beltiana Hertlein & Strong, 1951
 Turbonilla bengoensis Peñas & Rolán, 1997
 Turbonilla bertha Thiele, 1925
 † Turbonilla bexleyana Laws, 1937 
 Turbonilla biangulata (Robba, Di Geronimo, Chaimanee, Negri & Sanfilippo, 2004) 
 Turbonilla biolleyi Hertlein & Strong, 1951
 Turbonilla bisulcata Peñas & Rolán, 2010
 Turbonilla blanchae Peñas & Rolán, 2010
 Turbonilla boisselierae Peñas & Rolán, 2010
 Turbonilla boucheti Peñas & Rolán, 2010
 Turbonilla bougainville Peñas & Rolán, 2010
 Turbonilla brachia E.A. Smith, 1890
 Turbonilla brasiliensis Clessin, 1902
 † Turbonilla brevisutura (Laws, 1937)
 Turbonilla brodieae Peñas & Rolán, 2010
 Turbonilla buala Peñas & Rolán, 2010
 Turbonilla bucknilli (Laws, 1937)
 Turbonilla bughotu Peñas & Rolán, 2010
 Turbonilla burchi Gordon, 1938
 Turbonilla bushiana A. E. Verrill, 1882
 Turbonilla buteonis Bartsch, 1909
 Turbonilla buttoni Dautzenberg, 1912
 Turbonilla buzzurroi Peñas & Rolán, 2010

C

 Turbonilla cabrilloi Bartsch, 1917
 Turbonilla caca Bartsch, 1926
 Turbonilla cactiorum Peñas & Rolán, 2010
 Turbonilla caladoi Peñas & Rolán, 2010
 Turbonilla calini Espinosa & Ortea, 2014 
 Turbonilla callimene Bartsch, 1912
 Turbonilla callipeplum Dall & Bartsch, 1909
 Turbonilla calvini Dall & Bartsch, 1909
 Turbonilla campbellica Odhner, 1924
 Turbonilla canadensis Bartsch, 1917
 Turbonilla cancellata (Carpenter, 1857)
 Turbonilla candida (A. Adams, 1855)
 Turbonilla canfieldi Dall & Bartsch, 1907
 Turbonilla cangeyrani Ovalis & Mifsud, 2017
 Turbonilla canquei Dautzenberg, 1912
 Turbonilla capa Bartsch, 1926
 Turbonilla capixaba Pimenta & Absalao, 2004
 Turbonilla cara Nomura, 1936
 Turbonilla carlosruizi Peñas & Rolán, 2010
 Turbonilla carlotae Peñas & Rolán, 2010
 Turbonilla carlottoi Schander, 1994
 Turbonilla carmeae Peñas & Rolán, 2010
 Turbonilla carmenae Peñas & Rolán, 2010
 Turbonilla carpenteri Dall & Bartsch, 1909
 Turbonilla castanea (Keep, 1887)
 Turbonilla castanella Dall, 1908
 Turbonilla cbadamsi (Carpenter, 1857)
 Turbonilla cendoni Peñas & Rolán, 2010
 Turbonilla centrota Dall & Bartsch, 1909
 Turbonilla ceralva Dall & Bartsch, 1909
 Turbonilla cerina A. Adams, 1861
 Turbonilla cesai Peñas & Rolán, 2010
 Turbonilla chalcana Baker, Hanna & Strong, 1928
 Turbonilla charbarensis Melvill & Standen, 1901
 Turbonilla charezieuxi (Saurin, 1959)
 Turbonilla cheverti Hedley, 1901
 Turbonilla chinandegana Hertlein & Strong, 1951
 Turbonilla chirovanga Peñas & Rolán, 2010
 Turbonilla chocolata (Carpenter, 1864)
 Turbonilla choiseul Peñas & Rolán, 2010
 Turbonilla cholutecana Hertlein & Strong, 1951
 Turbonilla churia Bartsch, 1926
 Turbonilla cifara Bartsch, 1915 
 Turbonilla cincta A. Adams, 1860
 Turbonilla cinctella Mörch, 1859
 Turbonilla circumlata Peñas & Rolán, 2000
 Turbonilla circumsutura Peñas & Rolán, 2010
 Turbonilla clara Thiele, 1925
 Turbonilla clarinda Bartsch, 1912
 Turbonilla clarquei Peñas & Rolán, 2010
 Turbonilla clementina Bartsch, 1927
 Turbonilla cleo Thiele, 1925
 Turbonilla clessiniana Nomura, 1938
  † Turbonilla clifdenica Laws, 1937
 Turbonilla clippertonensis Hertlein & Allison, 1968
 Turbonilla cochimana Strong, 1949
 Turbonilla coeni Preston, 1905
 Turbonilla colimana Hertlein & Strong, 1951
 Turbonilla collea Bartsch, 1926
 † Turbonilla collisella T. OLdroyd, 1925 
 Turbonilla colpodes Melvill, 1910
 † Turbonilla comitas Laws, 1937 
 Turbonilla commoda A. Adams, 1860
 Turbonilla compsa Bush, 1899
 Turbonilla compta A. Adams, 1861
 Turbonilla confusa Brazier, 1877
 Turbonilla congoensis Peñas & Rolán, 2000
 Turbonilla conoma Bartsch, 1927
 Turbonilla conradi Bush, 1899
 Turbonilla consanguinea (E. A. Smith, 1891)
 Turbonilla constricta (E. A. Smith, 1891)
 † Turbonilla contexta Pilsbry & C. W. Johnson, 1917 
 Turbonilla contrerasiana Hertlein & Strong, 1951
 Turbonilla cookeana Bartsch, 1912
 Turbonilla cookiana (Laws, 1937)
 Turbonilla coomansi Van Aartsen, 1994
 Turbonilla cora (d'Orbigny, 1840)
 Turbonilla corgani Okutani, 1968
 Turbonilla corintoensis Hertlein & Strong, 1951
 Turbonilla cornea (A. Adams, 1853)
 Turbonilla corpulens Kirsch, 1959
 Turbonilla corrigea Laseron, 1959
 Turbonilla corsoensis Bartsch, 1917
 Turbonilla cortezi Bartsch, 1917
 Turbonilla corti Dautzenberg & Fischer H., 1897
 Turbonilla coseli Peñas & Rolán, 2002
 Turbonilla costadebilis Peñas & Rolán, 2010
 Turbonilla costasubtilis Peñas & Rolán, 2010
 Turbonilla costifera E.A. Smith, 1871
 Turbonilla cowlesi Strong & Hertlein, 1939
 Turbonilla coyotensis Baker, Hanna & Strong, 1928
 Turbonilla crassa Nomura, 1936
 Turbonilla craticulata Mörch, 1859
  † Turbonilla crebricostata Marwick, 1931
 Turbonilla crickmayi Strong & Hertlein, 1939
 Turbonilla crosnieri Peñas & Rolán, 2010
 Turbonilla cruzazae Peñas & Rolán, 2010
 Turbonilla cummingi Hori & Okutani, 1997
 Turbonilla cura Nomura, 1937
 Turbonilla curta Dall, 1889
 Turbonilla cynthiae De Jong & Coomans, 1988
 Turbonilla cyrtoconoidea Peñas & Rolán, 2010

D-E

 Turbonilla dakoi Peñas & Rolán, 2010
 Turbonilla dalli Bush, 1899
 Turbonilla danii Peñas & Rolán, 2010
 Turbonilla darwinensis Laseron, 1959
 Turbonilla datei Nomura, 1936
 Turbonilla davidpenasi Peñas & Rolán, 2010
 Turbonilla davidrolani Peñas & Rolán, 2010
 Turbonilla deae Nomura, 1937
 Turbonilla debilis A. Adams, 1860
 Turbonilla deboeri De Jong & Coomans, 1988
 Turbonilla decora E. A. Smith, 1904
 Turbonilla delia Melvill, 1906
 Turbonilla delicata Monterosato, 1874
 Turbonilla delmontana Bartsch, 1937
 Turbonilla delphineae Peñas & Rolán, 2010
 Turbonilla denizi Peñas & Rolán, 2000
 † Turbonilla denseplicata Koenen, 1882 
 Turbonilla densesculpturata Peñas & Rolán, 2010
 Turbonilla depressacostae Peñas & Rolán, 2010
 Turbonilla deprofundis Barnard, 1963
 Turbonilla deschampsi Peñas & Rolán, 2010
 Turbonilla deseadensis Di Luca, Güller & Zelaya, 2021
 Turbonilla diegensis Dall & Bartsch, 1909
 Turbonilla dilutacostae Peñas & Rolán, 2010
 Turbonilla dimatteoi Peñas & Rolán, 2010
 Turbonilla dina Dall & Bartsch, 1909
 Turbonilla dinora Bartsch, 1912
 Turbonilla dipsycha (Watson, 1886)
 Turbonilla discrepata Peñas & Rolán, 2010
 Turbonilla dispar Pilsbry, 1897
 Turbonilla disparapex Peñas & Rolán, 2010
 Turbonilla domingana Hertlein & Strong, 1951
 Turbonilla dongbaensis Saurin, 1959
 Turbonilla dora Bartsch, 1917
 Turbonilla doredona Bartsch, 1917
 Turbonilla dracona Bartsch, 1912
 Turbonilla ducalis Thiele, 1925
 Turbonilla dunedinensis (Laws, 1937)
 Turbonilla dunkeri Clessin, 1902
 Turbonilla dunkeriformis (Saurin, 1959)
 Turbonilla duodecimlyrae Peñas & Rolán, 2010
 Turbonilla duodenae Peñas & Rolán, 2010
 † Turbonilla duplicaria Marwick, 1931 
 Turbonilla duquei Peñas & Rolán, 2010
 Turbonilla dusiana Nomura, 1937
 Turbonilla edgarii (Melvill, 1896)
 Turbonilla edoensis Yokoyama, 1927
 Turbonilla eduardi Peñas & Rolán, 2010
 Turbonilla edwardensis Bartsch, 1909
 Turbonilla effusa (Gould, 1861)
 Turbonilla ekidana Hertlein & Strong, 1951
 Turbonilla electra Bartsch, 1927
 Turbonilla elegans (d'Orbigny, 1841)
 Turbonilla elegantula A. E. Verrill, 1882
 Turbonilla elejabeitiae Peñas & Rolán, 2010
 Turbonilla eleonora Thiele, 1925
 Turbonilla elsa Thiele, 1925
 Turbonilla elvira Thiele, 1925
 Turbonilla emertoni A. E. Verrill, 1882
 Turbonilla emiliae Melvill, 1896
 Turbonilla emma Thiele, 1925
 Turbonilla enamelicolor Nomura, 1936
 Turbonilla encella Bartsch, 1912
 Turbonilla engbergi Bartsch, 1920
 Turbonilla enna Bartsch, 1927
 Turbonilla eodem Penas & Rolán, 1999
 Turbonilla eques Laws, 1937
 Turbonilla eritima E. A. Smith, 1890
 Turbonilla errabunda (Laws, 1937)
 † Turbonilla erratica Laws, 1937 
 † Turbonilla eruita (Laws, 1950) 
 Turbonilla erythrosclera (Mörch, 1875)
 Turbonilla eschscholtzi Dall & Bartsch, 1907
 Turbonilla escondida Poppe, Tagaro & Stahlschmidt, 2015
 Turbonilla eucosmobasis Dall & Bartsch, 1907
 Turbonilla eucteana Melvill, 1910
 Turbonilla eugeniae (Saurin, 1959)
 Turbonilla eupellucida Nomura, 1937
 Turbonilla eva Bartsch, 1917
 Turbonilla evadna Bartsch, 1924
 Turbonilla evagone Bartsch, 1924
 Turbonilla evanescens Peñas & Rolán, 2010
 † Turbonilla evelynae (Laws, 1937) 
 Turbonilla excolpa Dall & Bartsch, 1909
 Turbonilla exilis (C. B. Adams, 1850)
 Turbonilla exilispira Melvill, 1918
 Turbonilla eyerdami Bartsch, 1927

F-G

 † Turbonilla facki Koenen, 1882 
 Turbonilla fackenthallae Smith & Gordon, 1948
 Turbonilla farinatiae Pimenta & Absalao, 2004
 Turbonilla farroupilha Pimenta & Absalao, 2004
 Turbonilla fasciata (d'Orbigny, 1840)
 Turbonilla fastigata Peñas & Rolán, 2010
 Turbonilla fatuhiva Peñas & Rolán, 2010
 Turbonilla favilla Dall & Bartsch, 1909
 Turbonilla felicita Laseron, 1959
 Turbonilla felisae Peñas & Rolán, 2010
 Turbonilla fernandezantoni Peñas & Rolán, 2010
 Turbonilla fernandoi Peñas & Rolán, 2010
 Turbonilla ferrani Peñas & Rolán, 2010
 Turbonilla festiva de Folin, 1867
 Turbonilla fideliformis Peñas & Rolán, 2010
 Turbonilla fijianorum Peñas & Rolán, 2010
 Turbonilla fijiensis Peñas & Rolán, 2010
 Turbonilla finlayi Powell, 1926
 Turbonilla fischeri E. A. Smith, 1891
 Turbonilla fitoi Peñas & Rolán, 2010
 Turbonilla flaianoi Mazziotti, Agamennone, Micali & Tisselli, 2006
 Turbonilla flavescens (Carpenter, 1857)
 Turbonilla flexicosta (Laseron, 1951)
 Turbonilla fijianorum Peñas & Rolán, 2010
 Turbonilla fijiensis Peñas & Rolán, 2010
 Turbonilla finlayi A. W. B. Powell, 1926
 Turbonilla fitoi Peñas & Rolán, 2010
 Turbonilla flaianoi Mazziotti, Agamennone, Micali & Tisselli, 2006
 Turbonilla flavescens (Carpenter, 1857)
 Turbonilla florida Peñas & Rolán, 2010
 Turbonilla fontainei Peñas & Rolán, 2010
 Turbonilla fonteini De Jong & Coomans, 1988
 Turbonilla forsteriana (Laws, 1937)
 Turbonilla forticostae Peñas & Rolán, 2010
 Turbonilla fragilis A. Adams, 1860
 Turbonilla franciscana Bartsch, 1917
 Turbonilla francisquitana Baker, Hanna & Strong, 1928
 Turbonilla fraterna Melvill, 1910
 Turbonilla fulgidula (Jeffreys, 1884)
 Turbonilla fulvizonata Nomura, 1938
 Turbonilla funiculata de Folin, 1868
 Turbonilla fusca (A. Adams, 1853)
 Turbonilla fuscoelongata Peñas & Rolán, 1997
 Turbonilla fustis Odé, 1995
 Turbonilla gabbiana (J. G. Cooper, 1867)
 Turbonilla gabrielae Peñas, Rolán & Swinnen, 2014
 Turbonilla galactodes Melvill, 1910
 Turbonilla galapagensis Dall & Bartsch, 1909
 Turbonilla galianoi Dall & Bartsch, 1909
 Turbonilla garciai Peñas & Rolán, 2010
 Turbonilla garrettiana Dall & Bartsch, 1906
 Turbonilla garthi Strong & Hertlein, 1939
 Turbonilla gemmula E. A. Smith, 1904
 Turbonilla gemmulata (Saurin, 1959)
 Turbonilla genilda Dall & Bartsch, 1909
 Turbonilla geraudiei (Saurin, 1959)
 Turbonilla gerda Thiele, 1925
 Turbonilla ghanensis Peñas & Rolán, 1997
 Turbonilla giannuzzii Peñas & Rolán, 2010
 Turbonilla gibbosa (Carpenter, 1857)
 Turbonilla gilli Dall & Bartsch, 1907
 Turbonilla giribeti Peñas & Rolán, 2010
 Turbonilla gitaena Dautzenberg & Fischer H., 1897
 Turbonilla gloriamishimana Hori & Fukuda, 1999
 Turbonilla gloriosa Bartsch, 1912
 Turbonilla gofasi Peñas & Rolán, 1999
 Turbonilla gonzagensis Baker, Hanna & Strong, 1928
 Turbonilla gonzaloi Peñas & Rolán, 2010
 Turbonilla gordoniana Hertlein & Strong, 1951
 Turbonilla goudi Peñas & Rolán, 2002
 Turbonilla goytacazi Pimenta & Absalao, 2004
 Turbonilla gracilior (C. B. Adams, 1852)
 † Turbonilla gracilis (Brocchi, 1814) 
 Turbonilla gracillima (Carpenter, 1857)
 Turbonilla gradata Bucquoy, Dautzenberg & Dollfus, 1883
 Turbonilla grandis A. E. Verrill, 1885
 † Turbonilla granti (Laws, 1937) 
 Turbonilla gravicosta (Laseron, 1951)
 Turbonilla gravis (Laseron, 1951)
 Turbonilla grippi Bartsch, 1912
 Turbonilla grohi Peñas & Rolán, 2010
 Turbonilla gruberi Hertlein & Strong, 1951
 Turbonilla gruveli Dautzenberg, 1912
 Turbonilla guaicurana Strong, 1949
 Turbonilla guanacastensis Hertlein & Strong, 1951
 Turbonilla guatulcoensis Hertlein & Strong, 1951
 Turbonilla guerrai Peñas & Rolán, 2010
 Turbonilla guillemi Peñas & Rolán, 2010
 Turbonilla guilleni Bartsch, 1917
 Turbonilla gutierrezi Peñas & Rolán, 2010

H-J

 Turbonilla hadakazimana Nomura, 1938
 Turbonilla halanychi Lygre, Kongsrud & Schander, 2011
 Turbonilla haleyi Strong & Hertlein, 1939
 Turbonilla halibrecta Dall & Bartsch, 1909
 Turbonilla halidoma Dall & Bartsch, 1909
 Turbonilla halistrepta Dall & Bartsch, 1909
 Turbonilla hamata Nordsieck, 1972
 Turbonilla hamonvillei (Dautzenberg & Fischer H., 1896)
 Turbonilla hanagaiana Nomura, 1938
 Turbonilla hannai Strong, 1938
 Turbonilla hansi Peñas & Rolán, 2010
 Turbonilla haroldi E. A. Smith, 1890
 † Turbonilla harrisi Aldrich, 1907 
 Turbonilla hasimotoi Nomura, 1937
 Turbonilla hattenbergeri Peñas & Rolán, 1997
 † Turbonilla haugrandis Marwick, 1931 
 Turbonilla haullevillei Dautzenberg, 1912
 Turbonilla haycocki Dall & Bartsch, 1911
 Turbonilla hecuba Dall & Bartsch, 1913
 Turbonilla hedleyi (Laseron, 1951)
 Turbonilla heilprini Bush, 1899
 Turbonilla hella Thiele, 1925
 Turbonilla hemphilli Bush, 1899
 Turbonilla hermia Melvill, 1906
 Turbonilla hernandezi Peñas & Rolán, 2010
 Turbonilla hertha Thiele, 1925
 Turbonilla hespera Bartsch, 1927
 Turbonilla heterolopha Dall & Bartsch, 1909
 Turbonilla hilda Thiele, 1925
 Turbonilla hipolitensis Dall & Bartsch, 1909
 Turbonilla hiradoensis Pilsbry, 1904
 Turbonilla histias Dall & Bartsch, 1909
 Turbonilla hoeisaeteri Lygre, Kongsrud & Schander, 2011
 Turbonilla hoeki (Dautzenberg & Fischer H., 1896)
 Turbonilla hofmani Angas, 1877
 Turbonilla holocenica Robba, Di Geronimo, Chaimanee, Negri & Sanfilippo, 2004
 Turbonilla homoeotata (Watson, 1886)
 Turbonilla honiara Peñas & Rolán, 2010
 Turbonilla houseri Dall & Bartsch, 1909
 Turbonilla hua Bartsch, 1926
 Turbonilla hulda Thiele, 1925
 Turbonilla humbertoi Peñas & Rolán, 2010
 Turbonilla hypolispa Dall & Bartsch, 1909
 Turbonilla icela Melvill, 1910
 Turbonilla idothea Bartsch, 1927
 Turbonilla iglesiasi Peñas & Rolán, 2010
 Turbonilla ignacia Dall & Bartsch, 1909
 Turbonilla ilfa Bartsch, 1927
 Turbonilla ima Dall & Bartsch, 1909
 Turbonilla imbana Yokoyama, 1922
 Turbonilla imperialis Dall & Bartsch, 1909
 Turbonilla ina Bartsch, 1917
 Turbonilla inaequabilis Peñas & Rolán, 1997
 Turbonilla inaequalis Melvill, 1904
 Turbonilla inca Bartsch, 1926
 Turbonilla incurva (Laseron, 1959)
 Turbonilla indenta (Laseron, 1959)
 Turbonilla indentata (Carpenter, 1857)
 Turbonilla indispensabilis Peñas & Rolán, 2010
 Turbonilla indonesiae van Aartsen & Corgan, 1996
 Turbonilla infans (Laseron, 1951)
 Turbonilla infantula Dall & Bartsch, 1906
 Turbonilla infelix Nomura, 1936
 Turbonilla inferiuslata Peñas & Rolán, 2010
 Turbonilla informis (Laws, 1937)
 Turbonilla infrabita Peñas & Rolán, 2010
 Turbonilla inobservata Peñas & Rolán, 1999
 † Turbonilla insititia Pilsbry & C. W. Johnson, 1917 
 Turbonilla insularis Dall & Simpson, 1901
 Turbonilla integra (Saurin, 1959)
 Turbonilla interrupta (Totten, 1835)
 Turbonilla intia Dall & Bartsch, 1926
 Turbonilla iolausi Dall & Bartsch, 1955
 Turbonilla irena Thiele, 1925
 Turbonilla iredalei (Laseron, 1959)
 Turbonilla isabelita Peñas & Rolán, 2010
 Turbonilla isabelitae Peñas & Rolán, 2000
 Turbonilla isabella Thiele, 1925
 Turbonilla isae Peñas & Rolán, 2010
 Turbonilla iseborae Lygre & Schander, 2010
 Turbonilla israelskyi Strong & Hertlein, 1939
 Turbonilla ista Bartsch, 1917 
 † Turbonilla itiharana Nomura, 1938 
 † Turbonilla itikawana Nomura, 1938 
 Turbonilla jactura (Laws, 1937)
 Turbonilla javiercondei Peñas & Rolán, 2010
 Turbonilla javii Peñas & Rolán, 2010
 Turbonilla jeffreysii (Jeffreys, 1848)
 Turbonilla jewetti Dall & Bartsch, 1909
 Turbonilla joelleae Peñas & Rolán, 2010
 Turbonilla johnsoni Baker, Hanna & Strong, 1928
 Turbonilla jordii Peñas & Rolán, 2002
 Turbonilla jorgei Peñas & Rolán, 2010
 Turbonilla joseantonioi Peñas & Rolán, 2010
 Turbonilla joubini Dautzenberg, 1912
 Turbonilla josephi (Saurin, 1959)
 Turbonilla jozinae van Aartsen & Corgan, 1996
 Turbonilla juanhorroi Peñas & Rolán, 2010
 Turbonilla juani Bartsch, 1917
 Turbonilla juliae Peñas & Rolán, 2010

K-L

 † Turbonilla kaawa (Laws, 1937) 
 Turbonilla kaapor Pimenta & Absalao, 2004
 Turbonilla kadavu Peñas & Rolán, 2010
 Turbonilla kaliwana Strong, 1949
 Turbonilla kamayura Silva-Absalao, Dos Santos & De Olivera, 2003
 Turbonilla kanagawana Nomura, 1938
 Turbonilla kathiewayae Peñas & Rolán, 2010
 † Turbonilla kawanoensis Nomura, 1939 
 Turbonilla keisukeana Yokoyama, 1927
 Turbonilla kelseyi Dall & Bartsch, 1909
  † Turbonilla kereruensis (Laws, 1937)
 Turbonilla kerstinae Schander, 1994
 Turbonilla kesennumana Nomura, 1938
 Turbonilla kidoensis (Yokoyama, 1922)
 Turbonilla kincaidi Bartsch, 1912
 Turbonilla kingi (Laws, 1937)
 Turbonilla kitcheni (Laseron, 1951)
 Turbonilla kmagha Peñas & Rolán, 2010
 Turbonilla koehleri Peñas & Rolán, 2010
 † Turbonilla koeneniana Sacco, 1892 †
  † Turbonilla komitica Laws, 1937
 Turbonilla korantengi Lygre & Schander, 2010
 † Turbonilla koruahina Laws, 1937 
 Turbonilla krakstadi Lygre & Schander, 2010
 Turbonilla kraussii Clessin, 1890
 Turbonilla krebsii (Mörch, 1875)
 Turbonilla kugyoi Nomura, 1938
 Turbonilla kuraenohamana Hori & Fukuda, 1999
 Turbonilla kurodai Nomura, 1936
 † Turbonilla kururiensis Nomura, 1939 
 Turbonilla kymatoessa (Watson, 1886)
 Turbonilla laboutei Peñas & Rolán, 2010
 Turbonilla lactea (Linnaeus, 1758)
 Turbonilla laevicostata Sowerby III, 1892
 Turbonilla laminata (Carpenter, 1864)
 Turbonilla laminedentata de Folin, 1879
 Turbonilla lamna Bartsch, 1917
 Turbonilla lamyi Hedley, 1916
 Turbonilla landersi Peñas & Rolán, 2010
 Turbonilla langae (Saurin, 1959)
 Turbonilla lara Dall & Bartsch, 1909
 Turbonilla larranagai Peñas & Rolán, 2010
 Turbonilla larunda Dall & Bartsch, 1909
 Turbonilla latacosta (Laseron, 1959)
 Turbonilla lataminuta Peñas & Rolán, 2010
 Turbonilla laticonica Nomura, 1936
 Turbonilla latilabri Peñas & Rolán, 2010
 Turbonilla laura Thiele, 1925
 Turbonilla laurae Peñas & Rolán, 2010
 Turbonilla lawsi (Powell, 1937)
 Turbonilla lazaroensis Bartsch, 1917
 Turbonilla legoffi Peñas & Rolán, 2010
 Turbonilla lehouarnoi Peñas & Rolán, 2010
 Turbonilla leniterdentata Peñas & Rolán, 2010
 Turbonilla lepta Pimenta & Absalao, 2004 (Preoccupied by Turbonilla lepta Dall & Bartsch, 1909, but no replacement name is available. )
 Turbonilla lepta Dall & Bartsch, 1909
 Turbonilla leqatai Peñas & Rolán, 2010
 Turbonilla leta Bartsch, 1927
 Turbonilla lerichei (Saurin, 1959)
 Turbonilla leuca Bush, 1899
 Turbonilla levis (C. B. Adams, 1850)
 Turbonilla levisculpturata Peñas & Rolán, 2010
 Turbonilla levislyrata Peñas & Rolán, 2010
 Turbonilla lillingtoniana (Laws, 1937)
 Turbonilla lillybeckae Nowell-Usticke, 1969
 Turbonilla linearis (Laseron, 1959)
 Turbonilla linjaica Melvill & Standen, 1901
 Turbonilla lirata (A. Adams, 1855)
 Turbonilla lituyana Dall & Bartsch, 1909
 Turbonilla liufaui Peñas & Rolán, 2010
 Turbonilla loboi Peñas & Rolán, 2010
 Turbonilla loiclegoffi Peñas & Rolán, 2010
 Turbonilla lopezyartoi Peñas & Rolán, 2010
 Turbonilla lordii (E. A. Smith, 1880)
 Turbonilla louiseae Clarke, 1954
 Turbonilla lozoueti Peñas & Rolán, 2002
 Turbonilla luandensis Peñas & Rolán, 1997
 Turbonilla lucana Dall & Bartsch, 1909
 Turbonilla lucina Nomura, 1938
 Turbonilla lyalli Dall & Bartsch, 1907

M

 Turbonilla macaensis Pimenta & Absalao, 2001
 Turbonilla macandreae (Adams H., 1871)
 Turbonilla macbridei Dall & Bartsch, 1909
 † Turbonilla macies Laws, 1937 
 Turbonilla macleayana Tenison-Woods, 1876
 Turbonilla macouni Dall & Bartsch, 1910
 Turbonilla macra Dall & Bartsch, 1909
 † Turbonilla macsotayi (Landau & LaFollette, 2015)
 Turbonilla madriella Strong, 1938
 Turbonilla madrinensis Lamy, 1905
 Turbonilla maestratii Pimenta & Absalao, 2004
 Turbonilla magdalinensis Bartsch, 1927
 Turbonilla magister van Aartsen & Corgan, 1996
 Turbonilla magnacastanea Peñas & Rolán, 2010
 Turbonilla magnifica (Seguenza G., 1879)
 Turbonilla magroi Peñas & Rolán, 2010
 Turbonilla major (C. B. Adams, 1852)
 Turbonilla mala Nomura, 1937
 Turbonilla malaita Peñas & Rolán, 2010
 Turbonilla malakula Peñas & Rolán, 2010
 Turbonilla malaquiasi Peñas & Rolán, 2010
 Turbonilla malulu Peñas & Rolán, 2010
 Turbonilla manaoba Peñas & Rolán, 2010
 Turbonilla manoloi Peñas & Rolán, 2010
 Turbonilla manolorolani Peñas & Rolán, 2010
 Turbonilla mara Bartsch, 1926
 Turbonilla mariae Tenison-Woods, 1875
 Turbonilla mariajoseae Peñas & Rolán, 2010
 Turbonilla mariana Bartsch, 1917
 Turbonilla marnayae Saurin, 1959
 Turbonilla marshalli Dall & Bartsch, 1909
 Turbonilla martae Peñas & Rolán, 1997
 Turbonilla martha Thiele, 1925
 Turbonilla martinezortii Peñas & Rolán, 2010
 Turbonilla masamunei Nomura, 1936
 Turbonilla masayana Hertlein & Strong, 1951
 Turbonilla mataderorum Peñas & Rolán, 2010
 † Turbonilla mateldae Selli, 1974 
 Turbonilla matsushimensis Nomura, 1936
 Turbonilla matusimensis Nomura, 1936
 Turbonilla mayana Baker, Hanna & Strong, 1928
 Turbonilla mcguirei Strong & Hertlein, 1939
 Turbonilla meanguerensis Hertlein & Strong, 1951
 Turbonilla mediocris Peñas & Rolán, 1999
 Turbonilla megascymna Silva-Absalao, Dos Santos & De Olivera, 2003
 Turbonilla melea Bartsch, 1927
 Turbonilla melitta Thiele, 1925
 Turbonilla melvilli Dautzenberg, 1912
 Turbonilla mendana Peñas & Rolán, 2010
 Turbonilla menoui Peñas & Rolán, 2010
 Turbonilla mercedesae Peñas & Rolán, 2010
 Turbonilla mermeroglaphyra Silva-Absalao, Dos Santos & De Olivera, 2003
 Turbonilla metulina A. Adams, 1860
 Turbonilla mexicana Dall & Bartsch, 1909
 Turbonilla micalii Peñas & Rolán, 2010
 Turbonilla micans (Monterosato, 1875)
 Turbonilla michaelis Melvill, 1910
 Turbonilla microperone Melvill, 1904
 Turbonilla midas Pimenta & Absalao, 2004
 Turbonilla middendorffi Bartsch, 1927
 Turbonilla mighelsi Bartsch, 1909
 Turbonilla miguelgomezi Peñas & Rolán, 2010
 Turbonilla migueloi Peñas & Rolán, 2010
 Turbonilla minna Thiele, 1925
 Turbonilla miona Bartsch, 1927
 Turbonilla mira Nomura, 1937
 Turbonilla mirifica Pallary, 1904
 Turbonilla mitis (Laws, 1937)
 Turbonilla miurana Nomura, 1937
 Turbonilla modesta (d'Orbigny, 1841)
 Turbonilla modica A. Adams, 1860
 Turbonilla molini Peñas & Rolán, 2010
 Turbonilla mollita Nomura, 1937
 Turbonilla mongga Peñas & Rolán, 2010
 Turbonilla monilifera Dall & Bartsch, 1909
 Turbonilla montoyai Peñas & Rolán, 2010
 Turbonilla montserratae Peñas & Rolán, 2010
 Turbonilla moorei Laws, 1937
 Turbonilla morchi Dall & Bartsch, 1907
 Turbonilla morenoi Peñas & Rolán, 2010
 Turbonilla mormuloides Nomura, 1936
 Turbonilla muelleri Maltzan, 1885
 Turbonilla multicostata (C. B. Adams, 1850)
 Turbonilla multilirata (Monterosato, 1875)
 Turbonilla mumia (A. Adams, 1861)
 Turbonilla munda A. Adams, 1860
 Turbonilla muricata (Carpenter, 1857)
 Turbonilla muricatoides Dall & Bartsch, 1907
 Turbonilla murilloi Peñas & Rolán, 2010
 Turbonilla musorstom Peñas & Rolán, 2010
 Turbonilla myia Bartsch, 1927

N-O

 Turbonilla nahuana Baker, Hanna & Strong, 1928
 Turbonilla nahuatliana Hertlein & Strong, 1951
 Turbonilla nana (Laseron, 1959)
 Turbonilla nanseni Lygre, Kongsrud & Schander, 2011
 Turbonilla nansoutii de Folin, 1873
 Turbonilla nata Nomura, 1938
 † Turbonilla natales Laws, 1937 
 Turbonilla neocaledonica Peñas & Rolán, 2010
 Turbonilla neogila Melvill, 1910
 Turbonilla nereia Dall & Bartsch, 1909
 Turbonilla nesiotes Pimenta & Absalão, 1998
 Turbonilla newcombei Dall & Bartsch, 1907
 † Turbonilla ngatutura (Laws, 1940) 
 Turbonilla nicaraguana Hertlein & Strong, 1951
 Turbonilla nicarasana Hertlein & Strong, 1951
 Turbonilla nicholsi Dall & Bartsch, 1909
 Turbonilla nicobarica Thiele, 1925
 Turbonilla nicoyana Hertlein & Strong, 1951
 Turbonilla nigricolor Nomura, 1936
 Turbonilla nihilfere Peñas & Rolán, 2010
 Turbonilla ninona Laseron, 1959
 Turbonilla nippona Nomura, 1936
 Turbonilla nitida A. Adams, 1860
 Turbonilla nivea (Stimpson, 1851)
 Turbonilla nodai (Robba, Di Geronimo, Chaimanee, Negri & Sanfilippo, 2004)
 Turbonilla nodoscalare Peñas & Rolán, 2010
 Turbonilla nodulosa (Laseron, 1959)
 Turbonilla nodulyrata Peñas & Rolán, 2010
 Turbonilla nofronii Peñas & Rolán, 1997
 Turbonilla nonica Bartsch, 1927
 Turbonilla nonnota Nomura, 1936
  †Turbonilla numamurana Nomura, 1938 
 Turbonilla nuttalli Dall & Bartsch, 1909
 Turbonilla nuttingi Dall & Bartsch, 1909
 Turbonilla nychia Bartsch, 1924
 † Turbonilla oamarua Laws, 1937 
 Turbonilla oaxacana Hertlein & Strong, 1951
 Turbonilla obeliscus (C. B. Adams, 1850)
 Turbonilla obesa Dall & Bartsch, 1909
 Turbonilla obliqua (Laseron, 1959)
 Turbonilla obliquata (Philippi, 1844)
 Turbonilla obsoleta (Carpenter, 1857)
 Turbonilla oceanica Oliver, 1915
 Turbonilla oenoa Bartsch, 1924
 † Turbonilla okadaensis Nomura, 1939 
 Turbonilla oligopleura Melvill, 1910
 Turbonilla olivellai Moreno, Peñas & Rolán, 2003
 Turbonilla oliverioi Peñas & Rolán, 1997
 Turbonilla opisthocostae Peñas & Rolán, 2010
 Turbonilla oregonensis Dall & Bartsch, 1907
 Turbonilla orientica Corgan, 1970
 Turbonilla ornata (d'Orbigny, 1840)
 Turbonilla orthocostae Peñas & Rolán, 2010
 Turbonilla osrhomboides Peñas & Rolán, 2010
 Turbonilla osyuensis Nomura, 1936
 Turbonilla otnirocensis Hertlein & Strong, 1951
 Turbonilla ottomoerchi Hertlein & Strong, 1951
 Turbonilla otukai Nomura, 1938
 Turbonilla ovalis de Folin, 1868
 Turbonilla owenga (Laws, 1937)
 Turbonilla ozanneana Hertlein & Strong, 1951

P

 Turbonilla pablopenasi Peñas, Rolán & Swinnen, 2014
 Turbonilla pacaudi Peñas & Rolán, 2010
 Turbonilla pachypleura Melvill, 1910
 Turbonilla pagesi Peñas & Rolán, 2010
  † Turbonilla pakaurangiensis (Laws, 1939)
 Turbonilla panamensis (C. B. Adams, 1852)
 Turbonilla paquitae Peñas & Rolán, 2010
 † Turbonilla paraguanensis Landau & LaFollette, 2016 
 Turbonilla paralaminata Castellanos, 1982
 Turbonilla paramoea Dall & Bartsch, 1909
 Turbonilla parlucidula Nomura, 1936
 Turbonilla parsysti Peñas & Rolán, 2002
 Turbonilla parviscymna Pimenta & Absalao, 2004
 Turbonilla parvitesta Nomura, 1936
 Turbonilla paschalis Thiele, 1925
 Turbonilla patagonica Güller & Zelaya, 2019
 Turbonilla patricia Thiele, 1925
 Turbonilla patruelis Melvill, 1918
 Turbonilla paucicostulata Tokunaga, 1906
 Turbonilla paucilirata (Carpenter, 1857)
 Turbonilla paucina Laseron, 1959
 Turbonilla paucistriata (Jeffreys, 1884)
 Turbonilla paula Thiele, 1925
 Turbonilla pauli Smith & Gordon, 1958
 Turbonilla paulinoi Pimenta & Absalao, 2004
 Turbonilla pauper Nomura, 1936
 Turbonilla pauperata Locard, 1897
 Turbonilla paupercostae Peñas & Rolán, 2010
 Turbonilla paupercula Nomura, 1936
 Turbonilla pazana Dall & Bartsch, 1909
 Turbonilla pazensis Baker, Hanna & Strong, 1928
 Turbonilla pazondinae Peñas & Rolán, 2010
 Turbonilla peilei Dall & Bartsch, 1911
 Turbonilla penascoensis Lowe, 1935
 Turbonilla penasi Nofroni & Gubbioli, 2000
 Turbonilla penistoni Bush, 1899
 Turbonilla pentalopha Dall & Bartsch, 1903
 Turbonilla penuriacostarum Peñas & Rolán, 2010
 Turbonilla pequensis Dall & Bartsch, 1909
 † Turbonilla peraequa Pilsbry & C. W. Johnson, 1917 
 Turbonilla perelloi Peñas & Rolán, 2010
 Turbonilla perezdionisi Peñas & Rolán, 1997
 Turbonilla perfecta A. Adams, 1860
 Turbonilla pericuana Strong, 1949
 Turbonilla periscelida Dall & Bartsch, 1909
 Turbonilla perlepida A. E. Verrill, 1885
 † Turbonilla pertenuis Gabb, 1873 
 Turbonilla pesa Dall & Bartsch, 1910
 † Turbonilla petaneana (Laws, 1937) 
 Turbonilla phalera Dall & Bartsch, 1909
 Turbonilla phanea Dall & Bartsch, 1909
 Turbonilla philmaestratii Peñas & Rolán, 2010
 Turbonilla philomelae (Watson, 1886)
 Turbonilla phyllidis Melvill, 1910
 Turbonilla pierrelozoueti Peñas & Rolán, 2010
 Turbonilla pinguis (Laseron, 1951)
 Turbonilla pini Peñas & Rolán, 1997
 Turbonilla pizarroae Peñas & Rolán, 2010
 Turbonilla plana (Robba, Di Geronimo, Chaimanee, Negri & Sanfilippo, 2004)
 Turbonilla planicostata Yokoyama, 1922
 Turbonilla planitesta Nomura, 1936
 † Turbonilla plastica Guppy, 1896 
 Turbonilla pleijeli Schander, 1994
 † Turbonilla plicatula (Brocchi, 1814) 
 † Turbonilla pliocenica (Laws, 1937) 
 Turbonilla pluto Dall & Bartsch, 1909
 Turbonilla pocahontasae Henderson & Bartsch, 1914
 † Turbonilla polaris Hedley, 1916 
 Turbonilla porrecta (Laseron, 1959)
 Turbonilla porteri Baker, Hanna & Strong, 1928
 Turbonilla portoparkerensis Hertlein & Strong, 1951
 Turbonilla portoricana Dall & Simpson, 1901
 Turbonilla postacuticostata Sacco, 1892
 Turbonilla poupini Peñas & Rolán, 2010
 Turbonilla powelli Bucknill, 1924
 Turbonilla powhatani Henderson & Bartsch, 1914
 † Turbonilla praegravata Laws, 1940 
 Turbonilla prefasii Peñas & Rolán, 2010
 Turbonilla procerita (Laseron, 1959)
 Turbonilla prolongata (Carpenter, 1857)
 Turbonilla proneri Peñas & Rolán, 2010
 Turbonilla propingua (Laseron, 1951)
 Turbonilla prosocostae Peñas & Rolán, 2010
 † Turbonilla pseudactopora 
 Turbonilla pseudapproximata Nomura, 1936
 † Turbonilla pseudohumilis Nomura, 1938 
 Turbonilla pseudomala Nomura, 1938
 Turbonilla pseudomarteli Peñas & Rolán, 1997
 Turbonilla pseudomultigyrata Nomura, 1936
 Turbonilla puella Thiele, 1930
 Turbonilla pugetensis Bartsch, 1917
 † Turbonilla pukeuriensis Laws, 1937 
 Turbonilla pulchella (d'Orbigny, 1841)
 † Turbonilla pulchra Deshayes, 1861 
 Turbonilla pumila Seguenza G., 1876
 Turbonilla puncta (C. B. Adams, 1850)
 Turbonilla punctillum Melvill, 1910
 Turbonilla punctiperipherata Nomura, 1936
 Turbonilla punicea Dall, 1884
 Turbonilla pupodentata Peñas & Rolán, 2010
 Turbonilla pupoides (d'Orbigny, 1841)
 Turbonilla pupominuta Peñas & Rolán, 2010
 Turbonilla pusilla (Philippi, 1844)
 † Turbonilla pygmaea (Grateloup, 1838) 
 Turbonilla pyrgidium Tomlin & Shackleford, 1914
 Turbonilla pyrrha Bush, 1899
 Turbonilla pyrrha Bartsch, 1927: preoccupied name without replacement name

Q-R

 † Turbonilla quadruplator (Laws, 1940) 
 Turbonilla quaestuosa Melvill, 1910
 Turbonilla queenslandica (Laseron, 1959)
 Turbonilla quesadai Peñas & Rolán, 2010
 Turbonilla quintanai Peñas & Rolán, 2010
 Turbonilla rachialis Pimenta & Absalao, 2004
 Turbonilla rafaeli Peñas & Rolán, 1997
 Turbonilla rakiura (Laws, 1937)
 Turbonilla rambhanensis (Preston, 1914)
 Turbonilla ramosinsulae Peñas & Rolán, 2010
 † Turbonilla raptor (Laws, 1937) 
 Turbonilla raritans Nomura, 1936
 Turbonilla rathbuni Verrill & Smith, 1880
 Turbonilla ratusukunai Peñas & Rolán, 2010
 Turbonilla raymondi Dall & Bartsch, 1909
 Turbonilla realejoensis Hertlein & Strong, 1951
 Turbonilla recta Dall & Bartsch, 1909
 Turbonilla recticostata Melvill, 1910
 Turbonilla rectogallica Sacco, 1892
 Turbonilla redondoensis Bartsch, 1917
 Turbonilla regina Dall & Bartsch, 1909
 Turbonilla regis (Saurin, 1959)
 Turbonilla reticulata (C. B. Adams, 1850)
 Turbonilla rewa Peñas & Rolán, 2010
 Turbonilla rex Thiele, 1925
 Turbonilla rhabdoides (Watson, 1886)
 Turbonilla rhabdota (Watson, 1886)
 Turbonilla rhea Bartsch, 1927
 Turbonilla rhizophorae Hertlein & Strong, 1951
 Turbonilla richeri Peñas & Rolán, 2010
 Turbonilla ridgwayi Dall & Bartsch, 1909
 Turbonilla ridiculosa Nomura, 1937
 Turbonilla riisei (Mørch, 1875)
 Turbonilla rikuzenosimensis Nomura, 1938
 Turbonilla rima Bartsch, 1926
 Turbonilla rimaca Bartsch, 1926
 Turbonilla rinella Dall & Bartsch, 1910
 Turbonilla rixtae (De Jong & Coomans, 1988)
 Turbonilla rodejai Peñas & Rolán, 2010
 Turbonilla rodrii Peñas & Rolán, 2010
 Turbonilla rolingiana Saurin, 1962
 Turbonilla romeasiana Saurin, 1962
 Turbonilla rosapereirae Peñas & Rolán, 2010
 Turbonilla rosewateri Corgan & van Aartsen, 1993
 Turbonilla rubioi Peñas & Rolán, 1997
 Turbonilla rudoi Peñas & Rolán, 2010
 Turbonilla rushii Bush, 1899
 Turbonilla russell Peñas & Rolán, 2010

S

 Turbonilla salinasensis Bartsch, 1928
 Turbonilla samadiae Peñas & Rolán, 2010
 Turbonilla sanctorum Dall & Bartsch, 1909
 Turbonilla sandoi Nomura, 1938
 Turbonilla sanjuani Peñas & Rolán, 2010
 Turbonilla sanmatiensis Castellanos, 1982
 Turbonilla sansibarica Thiele, 1925
 Turbonilla santamariana Bartsch, 1917
 Turbonilla santarosana Dall & Bartsch, 1909
 Turbonilla santosana Dall & Bartsch, 1909
 Turbonilla scala (Laws, 1937)
 Turbonilla scalaeformis Peñas & Rolán, 2010
 Turbonilla scalariformis Thiele, 1930
 Turbonilla scaliola A. Adams, 1860
 Turbonilla scalpidens Watson, 1886
 Turbonilla scammonensis Bartsch, 1912
 Turbonilla scapulata Pimenta & Absalao, 2004
 Turbonilla scarabinoi Peñas & Rolán, 2010
 Turbonilla schlumbergeri Dautzenberg & Fischer H., 1896
 Turbonilla schmitti Bartsch, 1917
 Turbonilla scitula A. Adams, 1861
 Turbonilla scrobiculata Schander, 1994
 Turbonilla sculptilis A. Adams, 1860
 Turbonilla sealei Strong & Hertlein, 1939
 Turbonilla sebastiani Bartsch, 1917
 Turbonilla secernenda Dautzenberg, 1912
 Turbonilla secura Dall & Bartsch, 1906
 Turbonilla sedillina Dall & Bartsch, 1904
 Turbonilla semela Bartsch, 1924
 Turbonilla semicolorata Yokoyama, 1927
 Turbonilla semicostata (Jeffreys, 1884)
 † Turbonilla semicostata Lozouet & Maestrati, 1982 (secondary junior homonym)
 † Turbonilla semilaevigata (Laws, 1937) 
 Turbonilla senegalensis Maltzan, 1885
 † Turbonilla separabilis Laws, 1937 
 Turbonilla serrae Dall & Bartsch, 1907
 Turbonilla shigeohorii Peñas & Rolán, 2010
 Turbonilla shimeki Dall & Bartsch, 1909
 Turbonilla shuyakensis Bartsch, 1927
 Turbonilla signae Dall & Bartsch, 1909
 Turbonilla simileulimella Peñas & Rolán, 2010
 Turbonilla similtiberia Peñas & Rolán, 2010
 Turbonilla simpsoni Dall & Bartsch, 1909
 Turbonilla sinaloana Strong, 1949
 Turbonilla sinensis Sowerby III, 1894
 Turbonilla sinensis Pimenta & Absalão, 1998: primary homonym of Turbonilla sinensis G.B. Sowerby III, 1894, but no replacement name has been proposed 
 Turbonilla singularis Peñas & Rolán, 2010
 Turbonilla sinuosa (Jeffreys, 1884)
 Turbonilla sirena Bartsch, 1927
 Turbonilla sitioi Nomura, 1936
 Turbonilla smithi Strebel, 1905
 Turbonilla smithsoni Dall & Bartsch, 1909
 Turbonilla solidissima Nomura, 1936
 Turbonilla solomonensis Peñas & Rolán, 2010
 † Turbonilla someiensis Nomura, 1939 
 Turbonilla soniliana Hertlein & Strong, 1951
 Turbonilla sordida Nomura, 1936
 Turbonilla sororia Melvill, 1896
 † Turbonilla speighti Laws, 1937 
 Turbonilla speira (Ravenel, 1859)
 Turbonilla stearnsii Dall & Bartsch, 1903
 Turbonilla stegastris Melvill & Standen, 1901
 Turbonilla stelleri Bartsch, 1927
 Turbonilla stenogyra Dall & Bartsch, 1909
 Turbonilla stephanogyra Dall & Bartsch, 1909
 Turbonilla stillmani Smith & Gordon, 1948
 Turbonilla stimpsoni Bush, 1899
 Turbonilla stipes (Laws, 1937)
 Turbonilla stonei Strong & Hertlein, 1939
 † Turbonilla stoneleighana Laws, 1937 
 Turbonilla strebeli Corgan, 1969
 Turbonilla striosa (C. B. Adams, 1852)
 Turbonilla strongi Willett, 1931
 Turbonilla stylina (Carpenter, 1864)
 Turbonilla subdelia Saurin, 1959
 † Turbonilla submarginata Deshayes, 1861 
 Turbonilla subplanicostata Yokoyama, 1927
 Turbonilla substriata (C. B. Adams, 1850)
 Turbonilla subtilissima Dautzenberg, 1912
 Turbonilla subula Mörch, 1859
 Turbonilla subulina Monterosato, 1889
 Turbonilla sulacana Hertlein & Strong, 1951
 Turbonilla sultana Thiele, 1925
 Turbonilla summafulgens Peñas & Rolán, 2010
 Turbonilla sumneri Bartsch, 1909
 Turbonilla superba Dall & Bartsch, 1909
 Turbonilla supramirabilis Nomura, 1936
 Turbonilla sursumnodosa Peñas & Rolán, 2010
 Turbonilla susomendezi Peñas & Rolán, 1997
 Turbonilla suteri Powell, 1926
 Turbonilla suturabrevis Peñas & Rolán, 2010
 Turbonilla suva Peñas & Rolán, 2010
 Turbonilla swani Dall & Bartsch, 1909
 Turbonilla swinneni Peñas & Rolán, 1997
 † Turbonilla sycophanta (Laws, 1937) 
 Turbonilla sykesii Melvill, 1910
 Turbonilla syrtensis van Aartsen, 1981

T

 † Turbonilla tabanellii Bongiardino & Micali, 2018 
 Turbonilla talma Dall & Bartsch, 1910
 Turbonilla tanquamacus Peñas & Rolán, 2010
 Turbonilla tantilla Hornung & Mermod, 1924
 Turbonilla taroaniara Peñas & Rolán, 2010
 Turbonilla tarragai Peñas & Rolán, 2010
 Turbonilla tasmanica Tenison-Woods, 1875
 Turbonilla taylori Dall & Bartsch, 1907
 Turbonilla taylori Hedley, 1909 : preoccupied by Turbonilla taylori Dall & Bartsch, 1907, but specifically distinct.
 Turbonilla tecalco Bartsch, 1917
 Turbonilla tefunta Bartsch, 1915
 Turbonilla teganumana Yokoyama, 1922
 Turbonilla tegulata G. B. Sowerby III, 1892
 Turbonilla tehuantepecana Hertlein & Strong, 1951
 Turbonilla templadoi Peñas & Rolán, 1997
 Turbonilla templaris Melvill, 1898
 Turbonilla templetonis Hertlein & Strong, 1951
 Turbonilla tenuicosta Issel, 1869
 Turbonilla tenuicula (Gould, 1853)
 Turbonilla tenuilirata (Carpenter, 1857)
 Turbonilla terebralis (Carpenter, 1857)
 Turbonilla terebrina Melvill, 1896
 Turbonilla terminuslevis Peñas & Rolán, 2010
 † Turbonilla teutonoplicatula Sacco, 1892 
 Turbonilla textilis (Kurtz, 1860)
 Turbonilla thaanumi Pilsbry & Vanatta, 1908
 Turbonilla thakombau Peñas & Rolán, 2010
 Turbonilla theone Bartsch, 1927
 Turbonilla thewe Peñas & Rolán, 2010
 Turbonilla thornleyana Laseron, 1951
 Turbonilla thryallis Melvill, 1918
 Turbonilla thyne Bartsch, 1924
 Turbonilla tia Bartsch, 1926
 Turbonilla tiara May, 1911
 Turbonilla tiganourana Nomura, 1936
 Turbonilla tikkoensis Nomura, 1936
 Turbonilla tincta Sowerby III, 1900
 † Turbonilla tokaidoensis Nomura, 1939 
 Turbonilla tolteca Baker, Hanna & Strong, 1928
 Turbonilla tonbensis Nomura, 1939
 Turbonilla tongaensis Peñas & Rolán, 2010
 Turbonilla toniperezi Peñas & Rolán, 2010
 Turbonilla torquata (Gould, 1853)
 Turbonilla torresiana (Laseron, 1959)
 Turbonilla townsendi Melvill, 1910
 Turbonilla toyatani Henderson & Bartsch, 1914
 Turbonilla traveli Peñas & Rolán, 2010
 Turbonilla tremperi Bartsch, 1917
 Turbonilla tridentata (Carpenter, 1864)
 Turbonilla truncatelloides E. A. Smith, 1890
 † Turbonilla tubaui Peñas & Rolán, 2010
 Turbonilla tuberculosa Nomura, 1939 
 Turbonilla tuckeri Peñas & Rolán, 2010
 Turbonilla tugelae Barnard, 1963
 Turbonilla tupinamba Pimenta & Absalão, 2002
 † Turbonilla turella (Melleville, 1843)

U-Z

 Turbonilla uaca Pimenta & Absalao, 2004
 Turbonilla uespi Peñas & Rolán, 2010
 Turbonilla ulloa Bartsch, 1917
 Turbonilla ulyssi Hertlein & Strong, 1951
 Turbonilla umbrina Melvill, 1918
 Turbonilla undata (Carpenter, 1857)
 † Turbonilla undecimcostata Pilsbry & C. W. Johnson, 1917 
 † Turbonilla undulata Koenen, 1882 
 Turbonilla unicincta Melvill, 1910
 Turbonilla unifasciata (Carpenter, 1857)
 Turbonilla urdeneta Bartsch, 1917
 Turbonilla urgorrii Peñas & Rolán, 2010
 Turbonilla ursula Thiele, 1925
 Turbonilla uruguayensis Pilsbry, 1897
 Turbonilla utuana Hertlein & Strong, 1951
 Turbonilla vaghena Peñas & Rolán, 2010
 Turbonilla vaillanti (Dautzenberg & Fischer H., 1896)
 Turbonilla valdeobesa Peñas & Rolán, 2010
 Turbonilla valida Verrill & Bush, 1900
 Turbonilla vallata Melvill, 1912
 Turbonilla vana (Laseron, 1951)
 Turbonilla vanae (Saurin, 1959)
 Turbonilla vancouverensis (Baird, 1863)
 Turbonilla varicifera Tate, 1898
 Turbonilla varicosa (A. Adams, 1855)
 Turbonilla vatilau Peñas & Rolán, 2010
 Turbonilla vegrandis (Laws, 1937)
 Turbonilla velaini Tryon, 1886
 Turbonilla venusta Issel, 1869
 Turbonilla venustula A. Adams, 1860
 Turbonilla verecunda (Laws, 1937)
 Turbonilla veronica Thiele, 1925
 Turbonilla verrilli Bartsch, 1909
 Turbonilla vesperis Pilsbry & Lowe, 1932
 Turbonilla vestae Hertlein & Strong, 1951
 Turbonilla vexativa Dall & Bartsch, 1909
 Turbonilla vigilia (Laws, 1937)
 Turbonilla villeni Peñas & Rolán, 2010
 Turbonilla villi Peñas & Rolán, 2010
 Turbonilla vincula (Laseron, 1959)
 Turbonilla vinhi Saurin, 1959
 Turbonilla virga Dall, 1884
 Turbonilla virgata Dall, 1892
 Turbonilla virginica Henderson & Bartsch, 1914
 Turbonilla virginieherosae Peñas & Rolán, 2010
 Turbonilla virgo (Carpenter, 1864)
 Turbonilla virgulinoi Silva-Absalao, Dos Santos & De Olivera, 2003
 Turbonilla viridaria Dall, 1884
 Turbonilla viscainoi Bartsch, 1917
 Turbonilla vitilevu Peñas & Rolán, 2010
 Turbonilla vivesi Hertlein & Strong, 1951
 Turbonilla vix Pimenta & Absalão, 1998
 † Turbonilla waikura Marwick, 1931 
 Turbonilla waitemata (Laws, 1937)
 Turbonilla walpole Peñas & Rolán, 2010
 Turbonilla weldi Dall & Bartsch, 1909
 Turbonilla westermanni De Jong & Coomans, 1988
 Turbonilla wetmorei Strong & Hertlein, 1937
 Turbonilla whiteavesi Bartsch, 1909
 Turbonilla wickhami Dall & Bartsch, 1909
 Turbonilla willaseni Lygre, Kongsrud & Schander, 2011
 Turbonilla willetti Smith & Gordon, 1948
 Turbonilla wrightsvillensis E. N. Powell, 1983
 Turbonilla xartoi Peñas & Rolán, 2010
 Turbonilla yolettae Hertlein & Strong, 1951
 Turbonilla zacae Hertlein & Strong, 1951
 Turbonilla zatoi Nomura, 1936
 Turbonilla zealandica (Hutton, 1883)
 Turbonilla zulmae Pimenta & Absalão, 1998

Synonyms
The following species were brought into synonymy:
 

 Turbonilla aartseni Schander, 1994: synonym of Turbonilla melvilli Dautzenberg, 1912
 Turbonilla abrardi (Fischer-Piette & Nicklès, 1946): synonym of Pyrgiscus abrardi (Fischer-Piette & Nicklès, 1946)
 Turbonilla abrupta Clessin, 1902: synonym of Turbonilla nesiotes Pimenta & Absalão, 1998
 Turbonilla acosta Bartsch, 1919: synonym of Derjuginella rufofasciata (E.A. Smith, 1875)
 Turbonilla acuticostata (Jeffteys, 1884): synonym of Turbonilla postacuticostata Sacco, 1892
 Turbonilla admiranda Tate & May, 1900: synonym of Turbonilla fusca (A. Adams, 1855)
 Turbonilla affectuosa (Yokoyama, 1927): synonym of Parthenina affectuosa (Yokoyama, 1927)
 Turbonilla aglaia Bartsch, 1915: synonym of Polyspirella aglaia (Bartsch, 1915)
 Turbonilla albella Lovén, 1846: synonym of Odostomia unidentata (Montagu, 1803)
 Turbonilla albella A. Adams, 1861: synonym of Turbonilla orientica Corgan, 1970
 Turbonilla alma Thiele, 1925: synonym of Nisiturris alma (Thiele, 1925)
 Turbonilla ambigua Weinkauff, 1868: synonym of Chrysallida emaciata (Brusina, 1866): synonym of Parthenina emaciata (Brusina, 1866)
 Turbonilla ambulatia (Laseron, 1951): synonym of Asmunda ambulatia (Laseron, 1951)
 Turbonilla anfraconvex Peñas & Rolán, 2010: synonym of Nisiturris anfraconvex (Peñas & Rolán, 2010)
 Turbonilla angulifera Yokoyama, 1922: synonym of Aclis angulifera (Yokoyama, 1922)
 Turbonilla angusta (P. P. Carpenter, 1864): synonym of Chrysallida angusta P. P. Carpenter, 1864
 Turbonilla angusta Thiele, 1925: synonym of Turbonilla magister van Aartsen & Corgan, 1996
 Turbonilla angustissima Melvill, 1904: synonym of Nisiturris angustissima (Melvill, 1904)
 Turbonilla areolata A. E. Verrill, 1873: synonym of Turbonilla interrupta (Totten, 1835)
 Turbonilla attenuata (Jeffreys, 1884): synonym of Turbonilla micans (Monterosato, 1875)
 Turbonilla bahiensis (Castellanos, 1982): synonym of Careliopsis bahiensis (Castellanos, 1982)
 Turbonilla bartschi Aguayo & Rehder, 1936: synonym of Bacteridium bermudense (Dall & Bartsch, 1911)
 Turbonilla bathyraphe Sowerby III, 1901: synonym of Peristichia bathyraphe (Sowerby III, 1901)
 Turbonilla bedoti Dautzenberg, 1912: synonym of Turbonilla subulina Monterosato, 1889
 Turbonilla bella Dall & Bartsch, 1906: synonym of Turbonilla varicosa (A. Adams, 1855)
 Turbonilla brevis Pritchard & Gatliff, 1900: synonym of Linopyrga brevis (Pritchard & Gatliff, 1900)
 Turbonilla buttoni Dautzenberg, 1912: synonym of Turbonilla penasi Nofroni & Gubbioli, 2000
 Turbonilla caelatior Dall & Bartsch, 1906: synonym of Babella caelatior (Dall & Bartsch, 1906)
 Turbonilla callista Bartsch, 1915: synonym of Polyspirella callista (Bartsch, 1915)
 Turbonilla cancellata W.H. Turton, 1932: synonym of Pyrgiscus altenai van Aartsen & Corgan, 1996
 Turbonilla candida de Folin, 1870: synonym of Syrnola etiennei (Dautzenberg, 1912)
 Turbonilla cayucosensis Willett, 1929: synonym of Turbonilla gabbiana (J. G. Cooper, 1867)
 Turbonilla chitaniana Yokoyama, 1926: synonym of Acirsa chitaniana (Yokoyama, 1926)
 Turbonilla cingulata Dunker, 1860: synonym of Cingulina cingulata (Dunker, 1860)
 Turbonilla clavula Lovén, 1846: synonym of Liostomia clavula (Lovén, 1846)
 Turbonilla compressa (Jeffreys, 1884): synonym of Turbonilla amoena (Monterosato, 1878)
 Turbonilla convexiuscula Golikov, 1967: synonym of Turbonilla candida (A. Adams, 1855)
 Turbonilla corintoensis [sic] : synonym of [[Turbonilla corintonis]] Hertlein & A. M. Strong, 1951
 Turbonilla cornelliana (Newcomb, 1870): synonym of Turbonilla varicosa (A. Adams, 1855)
 † Turbonilla costulata Risso, 1826: synonym of Turbonilla lactea (Linnaeus, 1758)
 Turbonilla crebrifilata (Carpenter, 1865): synonym of Turbonilla tenuicula (Gould, 1853)
 Turbonilla crenata (Brown, 1827): synonym of Pyrgiscus crenatus (Brown, 1827)
 Turbonilla crenulifera Tate, 1892: synonym of Turbonilla beddomei (Petterd, 1884)
 Turbonilla crystallina Dall & Bartsch, 1906: synonym of Nisiturris crystallina (Dall & Bartsch, 1906)
 Turbonilla darnleyensis (Brazier, 1877): synonym of Nisiturris darnleyensis (Brazier, 1877)
 Turbonilla decussata Pease, 1861: synonym of Turbonilla varicosa (A. Adams, 1855)
 Turbonilla delicata (Monterosato, 1874): synonym of Turbonilla acuta (Donovan, 1804)
 Turbonilla delli Powell, 1976: synonym of Planpyrgiscus lawsi Dell, 1956
 Turbonilla delpretei Sulliotti, 1889: synonym of Parthenina indistincta (Montagu, 1808)
 Turbonilla densecostata (Philippi, 1844): synonym of Pyrgiscus rufus (Philippi, 1836)
 Turbonilla dextra Saurin, 1959: synonym of Exesilla dextra (Saurin, 1959)
 Turbonilla diezi Peñas & Rolán, 1997: synonym of Nisiturris diezi (Peñas & Rolán, 1997)
 Turbonilla digenes Dautzenberg & Fischer H., 1896: synonym of Eulimella digenes (Dautzenberg & Fischer, 1896)
 Turbonilla edgari [sic]: synonym of Turbonilla edgarii (Melvill, 1896)
 Turbonilla elegans (d’Orbigny, 1841): synonym of Turbonilla elegantula A. E. Verrill, 1882
 Turbonilla elegantula (A. Adams, 1860): synonym of Asmunda elegantula (A. Adams, 1860)
 Turbonilla elizabethae Pilsbry, 1918: synonym of Styloptygma lacteola Preston, 1903
 Turbonilla elongata Castellanos, 1982: synonym of Turbonilla zulmae Pimenta & Absalão, 1998
 Turbonilla elongata Pease, 1867: synonym of Turbonilla aulica Dall & Bartsch, 1906
 Turbonilla emaciata Brusina, 1866: synonym of Chrysallida emaciata (Brusina, 1866)
 Turbonilla engli Peñas & Rolán, 1997: synonym of Afroturbonilla engli (Peñas & Rolán, 1997)
 Turbonilla erna Thiele, 1925: synonym of Pyrgiscus thielei van Aartsen & Corgan, 1996
 Turbonilla eumenes Melvill, 1910: synonym of Pyrgiscus eumenes (Melvill, 1910)
 Turbonilla evermanni Baker, Hanna & Strong, 1928: synonym of Cingulina evermanni (Baker, Hanna & Strong, 1928)
 Turbonilla exilissima Nomura, 1938: synonym of Asmunda exilissima (Nomura, 1938)
 Turbonilla falcifera (Watson, 1881): synonym of Tragula falcifera (R. B. Watson, 1881)
 Turbonilla fernandezantoni Peñas & Rolán, 2010: synonym of Nisiturris fernandezantoni (Peñas & Rolán, 2010)
 Turbonilla filiola Yokoyama, 1927: synonym of Iravadia yendoi (Yokoyama, 1927)
 Turbonilla fluminensis Pimenta & Absalao, 2004: synonym of Nisiturris fluminensis (Pimenta & Absalão, 2004)
 Turbonilla formosa (Jeffreys, 1848): synonym of Turbonilla bushiana A. E. Verrill, 1882
 Turbonilla formosa scalaroides F. Nordsieck, 1972: synonym of Pyrgiscus rufus (Philippi, 1836)
 Turbonilla franciscoi Peñas & Rolán, 1997: synonym of Turbolidium franciscoi (Peñas & Rolán, 1997)
 Turbonilla fulvocincta Thompson, 1840: synonym of Turbonilla rufa (Philippi, 1836)
 Turbonilla gabrieli Hedley, 1910: synonym of Nisiturris gabrieli (Hedley, 1910)
 Turbonilla galatea Bartsch, 1967 : synonym of Turbonilla candida (A. Adams, 1855)
 Turbonilla gisela Thiele, 1925: synonym of Exesilla gisela (Thiele, 1925)
 Turbonilla gracillima Gabb, 1865: synonym of Chemnitzia gabbiana J.G. Cooper, 1867
 Turbonilla grossa Marshall, 1894: synonym of Turbonilla sinuosa (Jeffreys, 1884)
 Turbonilla gruveli var. multicostata Dautzenberg, 1912: synonym of Turbonilla gruveli Dautzenberg, 1912
 Turbonilla hannoni Pallary, 1912: synonym of Turbonilla pumila Seguenza G., 1876
 Turbonilla hannoni Pallary, 1920: synonym of Turbonilla subulina Monterosato, 1889
 Turbonilla haroldi Laws, 1937: preoccupied by Turbonilla haroldi E. A. Smith, 1890, but no replacement name has been proposed (April 2015)
 Turbonilla hebridarum Peñas & Rolán, 2010: synonym of Pyrgiscus hebridarum (Peñas & Rolán, 2010)
 Turbonilla helena Bartsch, 1915: synonym of Pyrgiscus ninettae van Aartsen & Corgan, 1996
 Turbonilla helena Thiele, 1925: synonym of Turbonilla indonesiae van Aartsen & Corgan, 1996
 Turbonilla hemphilli Bartsch, 1917: synonym of Turbonilla vix Pimenta & Absalão, 1998
 Turbonilla hiradoensis var. badia Pilsbry, 1904: synonym of Turbonilla hiradoensis Pilsbry, 1904
 Turbonilla hoecki (Dautzenberg & Fischer H., 1896): synonym of Turbonilla hoeki (Dautzenberg & Fischer H., 1896)
 Turbonilla hortensia Thiele, 1925: synonym of Pyrgulina tenerrima (Melvill, 1906)
 Turbonilla humboldti Risso, 1826: synonym of Euparthenia humboldti (Risso, 1826)
 Turbonilla incisa Bush: synonym of Houbricka incisa (Bush, 1899)
 Turbonilla incisa var. contricta K. J. Bush, 18999: synonym of Houbricka incisa (K. J. Bush, 1899)
 Turbonilla inclinata Bush: synonym of Turbonilla penistoni Bush, 1899
 Turbonilla inclinella Corgan & Van Aartsen, 1998: synonym of Nisiturris obliqua (Saurin, 1959)
 Turbonilla indistincta (Montagu, 1808): synonym of Chrysallida indistincta (Montagu, 1808)
 Turbonilla infans (Laseron, 1951): synonym of Graphis infans (Laseron, 1951)
 Turbonilla innovata Monterosato, 1884: synonym of Turbonilla pumila Seguenza G., 1876
 Turbonilla internodula (S.V. Wood, 1848): synonym of Pyrgolidium internodulum (S. V. Wood, 1848)
 Turbonilla iredalei (Laseron, 1959): synonym of Tathrella iredalei Laseron, 1959
 Turbonilla irma Thiele, 1925: synonym of Pyrgiscus irma (Thiele, 1925)
 Turbonilla isseli Tryon, 1886: synonym of Cingulina isseli (Tryon, 1886)
 Turbonilla jansseni van Aartsen, 1981: synonym of Turbonilla postacuticostata Sacco, 1892
 Turbonilla jeffreysii (Jeffreys, 1848): synonym of Pyrgiscus jeffreysii (Jeffreys, 1848)
 Turbonilla jozinae van Aartsen & Corgan, 1996: synonym of Graphis africana Bartsch, 1915
 Turbonilla kahoolawensis Pilsbry, 1918: synonym of Turbonilla lirata (A. Adams, 1855)
 Turbonilla kauaiensis Pilsbry, 1918: synonym of Turbonilla lirata (A. Adams, 1855)
 Turbonilla kobelti Dautzenberg, 1912: synonym of Eulimella kobelti (Dautzenberg, 1912)
 Turbonilla kraussi Clessin, 1900: synonym of Turbonilla kraussii H. Adams & A. Adams, 1853
 Turbonilla krumpermani De Jong & Coomans, 1988: synonym of Trabecula krumpermani (De Jong & Coomans, 1988)
 Turbonilla laysanensis Pilsbry, 1918: synonym of Styloptygma lacteola Preston, 1903
 Turbonilla limitum Brusina in de Folin & Périer, 1876: synonym of Chrysallida limitum (Brusina in de Folin & Périer, 1876): synonym of Parthenina limitum (Brusina in de Folin & Périer, 1876)
 Turbonilla lordi (E. A. Smith, 1880): synonym of Turbonilla lordii (E. A. Smith, 1880)
 Turbonilla ludovica Thiele, 1925: synonym of Asmunda ludovica (Thiele, 1925)
 Turbonilla lydia Thiele, 1925: synonym of Turbonilla crystallina Dall & Bartsch, 1906
 Turbonilla mabutii Nomura, 1938: synonym of Pyrgiscilla mabutii (Nomura, 1938): synonym of Pyrgiscus mabutii (Nomura, 1938)
 Turbonilla manorae Melvill, 1898: synonym of Turbonilla mumia (A. Adams, 1861)
 Turbonilla marteli Dautzenberg, 1912: synonym of Turbonilla haullevillei Dautzenberg, 1912
 Turbonilla microscopica Laseron, 1959: synonym of Turbonilla mumia (A. Adams, 1861)
 Turbonilla miyagiensis Nomura, 1936: synonym of Turbonilla aulica Dall & Bartsch, 1906
 Turbonilla modesta C. B. Adams, 1851: synonym of Turbonilla rixtae De Jong & Coomans, 1988
 Turbonilla modica A. Adams, 1860: synonym of Syrnola modica (A. Adams, 1860)
 Turbonilla monocycla A. Adams, 1860: synonym of Parthenina pagodula (A. Adams, 1860)
 Turbonilla morsei Yokoyama, 1926: synonym of Acirsa morsei (Yokoyama, 1926)
 Turbonilla multigyrata Dunker, 1882: synonym of Turbonilla candida (A. Adams, 1855)
 Turbonilla nitida Angas, 1867: synonym of Turbonilla hofmani Angas, 1877
 Turbonilla nitidissima Issel, 1869: synonym of Costosyrnola nitidissima (Issel, 1869)
 Turbonilla normalis Corgan & Van Aartsen, 1998: synonym of Turbonilla ambigua (Saurin, 1962)
 Turbonilla obeliscus Gould, 1861: synonym of Turbonilla secura Dall & Bartsch, 1906
 Turbonilla oblectamentum Pilsbry, 1918: synonym of Turbonilla lirata (A. Adams, 1855)
 Turbonilla obliquastructionis Peñas & Rolán, 2010: synonym of Nisiturris obliquastructionis (Peñas & Rolán, 2010)
 Turbonilla obliquata var. gallica Sacco, 1892: synonym of Turbonilla obliquata (Philippi, 1844)
 Turbonilla obliquecostata Dautzenberg, 1912: synonym of Turbonilla subulina Monterosato, 1889
 Turbonilla octona Guppy, 1896: synonym of Bacteridium resticulum (Dall, 1889)
 Turbonilla oscitans Lovén, 1846: synonym of Odostomia eulimoides Hanley, 1844 represented as Brachystomia eulimoides (Hanley, 1844)
 Turbonilla pallaryi Dautzenberg, 1910: synonym of Turbonilla pumila Seguenza G., 1876
 Turbonilla pallaryi Nordsieck, 1972: synonym of Turbonilla syrtensis van Aartsen, 1981
 Turbonilla palmerae Aguayo & Jaume, 1936: synonym of Turbonilla krebsii (Mörch, 1875)
 Turbonilla peasei Dall & Bartsch, 1906: synonym of Turbonilla aulica Dall & Bartsch, 1906
 Turbonilla pellucida (Sowerby III, 1897): synonym of Polyspirella pellucida (Sowerby III, 1897)
 Turbonilla pellucida var. affinis W. H. Turton, 1932: synonym of Polyspirella pellucida (G. B. Sowerby III, 1897)
 Turbonilla perexilis W. H. Turton, 1932: synonym of Graphis africana Bartsch, 1915
 Turbonilla perscalata Hedley, 1909: synonym of Linopyrga perscalata (Hedley, 1909)
 Turbonilla petri Bartsch, 1919: synonym of Derjuginella rufofasciata (E.A. Smith, 1875)
 Turbonilla phaula Dautzenberg & Fischer H., 1896: synonym of Eulimella phaula (Dautzenberg & H. Fischer, 1896)
 Turbonilla philippiana Dunker, 1860: synonym of Mormula philippiana (Dunker, 1860)
 Turbonilla pilsbryi Bush, 1899: synonym of Turbonilla riisei (Mørch, 1875)
 Turbonilla planulata Thiele, 1930: synonym of Turbonilla bayensis van Aartsen & Corgan, 1996
 Turbonilla pointeli de Folin, 1868: synonym of Ebala pointeli (de Folin, 1868)
 Turbonilla polita (A. E. Verrill, 1872): synonym of Eulimella polita (A. E. Verrill, 1872)
 Turbonilla portseaensis Gatliff & Gabriel, 1911: synonym of Linopyrga portseaensis (Gatliff & Gabriel, 1911)
 Turbonilla princeps Preston, 1905: synonym of Terenolla pygmaea (Hinds, 1844)
 Turbonilla prolongata W.H. Turton, 1932: synonym of Pyrgiscus prolongatus (W.H. Turton, 1932)
 Turbonilla protracta Dall, 1892: synonym of Turbonilla ornata (d'Orbigny, 1840)
 Turbonilla pseudocura Nomura, 1938: synonym of Turbonilla dunkeri Clessin, 1902
 Turbonilla pseudogradata F. Nordsieck, 1972: synonym of Turbonilla gradata Bucquoy, Dautzenberg & Dollfus, 1883
 Turbonilla pseudostricta F. Nordsieck, 1972: synonym of Turbonilla pumila Seguenza G., 1876
 Turbonilla punctiperpherarta [sic]: synonym of Turbonilla punctiperipherata Nomura, 1936
 Turbonilla punicea Okutani, 1964: synonym of Turbonilla corgani Okutani, 1968
 Turbonilla pupoides var. ischna K. J. Bush, 18999: synonym of Turbonilla pupoides (d'Orbigny, 1841)
 Turbonilla pusilla var. lactoides Chaster, 1898: synonym of Turbonilla pusilla (Philippi, 1844)
 Turbonilla pusilla var. rectogallica Sacco, 1892 accepted as Turbonilla rectogallica Sacco, 1892
 Turbonilla pygmaea Brusina, 1865: synonym of Chrysallida emaciata (Brusina, 1866): synonym of Parthenina emaciata (Brusina, 1866)
 Turbonilla qenenoji Peñas & Rolán, 2010: synonym of Turbolidium qenenoji (Peñas & Rolán, 2010)
 Turbonilla ratisukunai Peñas & Rolán, 2010: synonym of Turbonilla ratusukunai Peñas & Rolán, 2010
 Turbonilla romeasaina [sic]: synonym of Turbonilla romeasiana Saurin, 1962
 Turbonilla rosea von Maltzan, 1885: synonym of Turbonilla internodula (S. V. Wood, 1848)
 Turbonilla rufa (Philippi, 1836): synonym of Pyrgiscus rufus (Philippi, 1836)
 Turbonilla rufescens (Forbes, 1846): synonym of Pyrgiscus rufescens (Forbes, 1846)
 Turbonilla rugosa de Folin, 1870: synonym of Syrnola rugosa (de Folin, 1870)
 Turbonilla ryalli Peñas & Rolán, 1997: synonym of Nisiturris ryalli (Peñas & Rolán, 1997)
 Turbonilla salomonensis Peñas & Rolán, 2010: synonym of Turbonilla solomonensis Peñas & Rolán, 2010
 Turbonilla sanmatiense Castellanos, 1982: synonym of Turbonilla sanmatiensis Castellanos, 1982
 Turbonilla scalarina Brazier, 1894: synonym of Turbonilla beddomei (Petterd, 1884)
 Turbonilla scalaris (Philippi, 1836): synonym of Turbonilla jeffreysii (Jeffreys, 1848)
 Turbonilla scrobiculata Schander, 1994: synonym of Turbonilla angelinagagliniae Schander, 1997
 Turbonilla sculpturata W.H. Turton, 1932: synonym of Pyrgulina scripta van Aartsen & Corgan, 1996
 Turbonilla sculpturata Oliver, 1915: synonym of Graphis sculpturata (Oliver, 1915)
 Turbonilla sericea de Folin, 1868: synonym of Eulimella sericea (de Folin, 1868)
 Turbonilla smithi [sic]: synonym of Eulimella smithii (A. E. Verrill, 1880)
 Turbonilla smithi Strebel, 1905: synonym of Turbonilla strebeli Corgan, 1969
 Turbonilla smithii A. E. Verrill, 1880: synonym of Eulimella smithii (A. E. Verrill, 1880)
 Turbonilla sophia Thiele, 1925: synonym of Turbonilla tegulata G. B. Sowerby III, 1892
 Turbonilla speciosa A. Adams, 1860: synonym of Pyrgiscus speciosus (A. Adams, 1860)
 Turbonilla speciosa A. Adams, 1869: synonym of Turbonilla macandreae H. Adams, 1871
 Turbonilla stephanogyra Dall & Bartsch, 1909: synonym of Strioturbonilla stephanogyra (Dall & Bartsch, 1909) †
 Turbonilla striatula (Linnaeus, 1758): synonym of Pyrgostylus striatulus (Linnaeus, 1758)
 Turbonilla stricta Pallary, 1904: synonym of Turbonilla pumila Seguenza G., 1876
 Turbonilla stricta A. E. Verrill, 1873: synonym of Turbonilla nivea (Stimpson, 1851)
 Turbonilla stricta Clessin, 1902: synonym of Turbonilla sinensis Pimenta & Absalão, 1998
 Turbonilla striolata [sic]: synonym of Pyrgostylus striatulus (Linnaeus, 1758)
 Turbonilla subangulata (Carpenter, 1857): synonym of Bartschella subangulata (Carpenter, 1857)
 Turbonilla subulata (C. B. Adams, 1850): synonym of Turbonilla peilei Dall & Bartsch, 1911
 Turbonilla susanna Thiele, 1925: synonym of Nisipyrgiscus susanna (Thiele, 1925)
 Turbonilla swiftii Bush, 1899: synonym of Turbonilla penistoni Bush, 1899
 Turbonilla syrnoliformis Nomura, 1938: synonym of Ptycheulimella syrnoliformis (Nomura, 1938)
 Turbonilla tantilla var. megaembryo Hornung & Mermod, 1924: synonym of Turbonilla megaembryo Hornung & Mermod, 1924
 Turbonilla tasmanica Tenison Woods, 1876: synonym of Turbonilla beddomei (Petterd, 1884)
 Turbonilla tefunta Bartsch, 1915: synonym of Pyrgiscus tefunta (Bartsch, 1915)
 Turbonilla tenuis Pallary, 1904: synonym of Turbonilla rosewateri Corgan & van Aartsen, 1993
 Turbonilla tenuis W.H. Turton, 1932: synonym of Turbonilla jozinae van Aartsen & Corgan, 1996
 Turbonilla tenuissima Hedley, 1909: synonym of Graphis tenuissima (Hedley, 1909)
 Turbonilla terebra Dunker, 1860: synonym of Cingulina terebra (Dunker, 1860): synonym of Pseudocingulina terebra (Dunker, 1860)
 Turbonilla theresa Thiele, 1925: synonym of Turbonilla funiculata de Folin, 1868
 Turbonilla thornleyana Laseron, 1951: synonym of Graphis pellucida (Gatliff & Gabriel, 1911)
 Turbonilla tribulationis Hedley, 1909: synonym of Asmunda tribulationis (Hedley, 1909)
 Turbonilla tritonia Bartsch, 1915: synonym of Pyrgiscus tritonia (Bartsch, 1915)
 Turbonilla tumidulus de Folin, 1873: synonym of Turbonilla tumidula de Folin, 1873
 Turbonilla turrita (C. B. Adams, 1852): synonym of Asmunda turrita (C. B. Adams, 1852)
 Turbonilla umbilicaris Malm, 1863: synonym of Odostomia umbilicaris (Malm, 1863)
 Turbonilla unifasciata (Forbes, 1844): synonym of Tibersyrnola unifasciata (Forbes, 1844)
 Turbonilla unilirata Bush, 1899: synonym of Turbolidium uniliratum (Bush, 1899)
 Turbonilla varicosa Dunker, 1860: synonym of Turbonilla aulica Dall & Bartsch, 1906
 Turbonilla vitiensis Pilsbry, 1917: synonym of Turbonilla varicosa (A. Adams, 1855)
 Turbonilla vitiensis clavus Pilsbry, 1918: synonym of Turbonilla aulica Dall & Bartsch, 1906
 Turbonilla vladivostokensis Bartsch, 1929: synonym of Derjuginella rufofasciata (E.A. Smith, 1875)
 Turbonilla weinkauffi Dunker, 1862: synonym of Tragula fenestrata (Jeffreys, 1848)
 Turbonilla whitechurchi W.H. Turton, 1932: synonym of Pyrgulina whitechurchi (W.H. Turton, 1932)
 Turbonilla woodmassoni de Folin, 1879: synonym of Turbonilla woodmasoni de Folin, 1879
 Turbonilla xenophyes Melvill & Standen, 1912: synonym of Atomiscala xenophyes (Melvill & Standen, 1912)
 Turbonilla yanamii Yokoyama, 1926: synonym of Tachyrhynchus yanamii (Yokoyama, 1926)
 Turbonilla yoritomoi Nomura, 1938: synonym of Pyrgiscus yoritomoi (Nomura, 1938)
 Turbonilla zetemia Melvill, 1910: synonym of Nisipyrgiscus zetemia (Melvill, 1910)

Taxa inquerenda
 Turbonilla abbreviata W. H. Turton, 1932
 Turbonilla admirabilis W. H. Turton, 1932
 Turbonilla becki W. H. Turton, 1932
 Turbonilla bifasciata A. Adams, 1861
 Turbonilla columna W. H. Turton, 1932
 Turbonilla distincta W. H. Turton, 1932
 Turbonilla erecta W. H. Turton, 1932
 Turbonilla intersecta W. H. Turton, 1932
 Turbonilla liratula W. H. Turton, 1932
 Turbonilla multistriata W. H. Turton, 1932
 Turbonilla retusa W. H. Turton, 1932
 Turbonilla perexilis W. H. Turton, 1932
 Turbonilla perminima W. H. Turton, 1932
 Turbonilla producta W. H. Turton, 1932
 Turbonilla rietensis W. H. Turton, 1932
 Turbonilla rufanensis W. H. Turton, 1932
 Turbonilla subcancellata W. H. Turton, 1932
 Turbonilla subconica W. H. Turton, 1932
 Turbonilla subglobosa W. H. Turton, 1932

References

 Aartsen, J.J. van, 1981. European Pyramidellidae: II. Turbonilla.— Boll, malac. 17: 61-88. 
 Vaught, K.C. (1989). A classification of the living Mollusca. American Malacologists: Melbourne, FL (USA). . XII, 195 pp.
 Howson, C.M.; Picton, B.E. (Ed.) (1997). The species directory of the marine fauna and flora of the British Isles and surrounding seas. Ulster Museum Publication, 276. The Ulster Museum: Belfast, UK. . vi, 508 (+ cd-rom) 
 Gofas, S.; Le Renard, J.; Bouchet, P. (2001). Mollusca, in: Costello, M.J. et al. (Ed.) (2001). European register of marine species: a check-list of the marine species in Europe and a bibliography of guides to their identification. Collection Patrimoines Naturels, 50: pp. 180–213
 Spencer, H.; Marshall. B. (2009). All Mollusca except Opisthobranchia. In: Gordon, D. (Ed.) (2009). New Zealand Inventory of Biodiversity. Volume One: Kingdom Animalia. 584 pp
  Frøydis Lygre, Jon Anders Kongsrud and Christoffer Schander,  Four new species of Turbonilla (Gastropoda, Pyramidellimorpha, Turbonillidae) from the Gulf of Guinea, West Africa; African Invertebrates Vol. 52 (2) Pages 243–254 Pietermaritzburg December, 2011

External links

 
Pyramidellidae
Gastropod genera